Marie-Christine Coisne-Roquette (born 4 November 1956) is a French businesswoman. She serves as the chairwoman and chief executive officer of Sonepar.

Early life
Marie-Christine Coisne-Roquette was born on 4 November 1956. Her great, great grandfather, Henri Coisne co-founded Sonepar with Léopold Lambert in 1862; it was a textile company, and it later became a distributor of electrical equipment.

Coisne-Roquette graduated from Paris Nanterre University, where she earned a degree in English and Law.

Career
Coisne-Roquette began her career as a lawyer in 1980, when she joined Cabinet Sonier & Associés. She became a director of Sonepar in 1983, and joined the company in 1988. She has served as its chairwoman since 1998 and as its chief executive officer since 2002.

Coisne-Roquette is the founder and co-CEO of Financière de la Croix Blanche. She is also the founder of Roco Industries.

Coisne-Roquette serves on the board of directors of Total S.A. She served on the Executive Committee of the Mouvement des Entreprises de France from 2009 to 2013. She serves on the board of directors of the Association Nationale des Sociétés par Actions.

Personal life
Coisne-Roquette is married to Michel Roquette, who serves on the board of the Association pour la Recherche sur Alzheimer with her. In 2016, she was worth an estimated €3.6 billion with her family. They are the 20th richest family in France.

References

1956 births
20th-century French lawyers
20th-century French women lawyers
21st-century French lawyers
21st-century French women lawyers
Female billionaires
French billionaires
French chief executives
French women company founders
French corporate directors
Living people
University of Paris alumni
Women business executives